The Chief Whip of the Majority Party is an official office bearer in the National Assembly of South Africa. , Pemmy Majodina of the African National Congress (ANC) serves as the Chief Whip of the Majority Party. She is the second woman to hold the office.

Appointment
After being nominated by the majority party in the National Assembly, the speaker approves the appointment.

Functions
Although elections to the National Assembly are held using a system of proportional representation and Members of Parliament of the majority party are expected to vote in the desired way of party leadership, the position of Chief Whip was retained.

The Chief Whip of the Majority Party oversees the whipping system of the majority party and ensures that Members of Parliament belonging to the majority party attend plenary sessions and vote on legislation in the National Assembly. The Chief Whip, in discussion with the Chief Whip of the largest opposition party, is responsible for the programme of the National Assembly. The Chief Whip is also responsible for approving the budgets of parliamentary committees after consulting with the Chairperson of Committees.

Lists of Chief Whips
Since the creation of the National Assembly in 1994, the position has been held by a member of the African National Congress, the majority party in the National Assembly.

References

Political whips
Parliament of South Africa